The gens Viridia was an obscure plebeian family at ancient Rome.  Members of this gens are known only from inscriptions, evidently dating to imperial times.

Origin
The nomen Viridius seems to be derived from the Latin viridis, green.  Since one of the Viridii left a libationary inscription at Aquae Sulis in Britain, some connection with the obscure British deity Viridios has been suggested, but other Viridii are known from different parts of the Empire.

Branches and cognomina
Too few Viridii are known to tell if they were ever divided into distinct families.  Two cognomina appear in extant inscriptions: Firmus, a common surname that translates as "firm, strong, hardy", and Tertulla, a diminutive of Tertia, an old feminine praenomen, which was widely used as a surname throughout Roman history.

Members
 Viridia, named in an inscription from Narbo in Gallia Narbonensis.
 Publius Viridius, named in an inscription Forum Julii in the province of Venetia and Histria, dating to the latter part of the first century AD.
 Quintus Viridius, dedicated a libation to the goddess Sulis, the local genius of Aquae Sulis in Britain.
 Viridius Firmus, named in an inscription from Poetovio in Pannonia Superior, dating to AD 244, and dedicated to Mithras as Sol Invictus.
 Viridia Tertulla, the mother of Albucia Tertulla, buried at Brixia in Venetia and Histria.

See also
 List of Roman gentes

References

Bibliography
 Theodor Mommsen et alii, Corpus Inscriptionum Latinarum (The Body of Latin Inscriptions, abbreviated CIL), Berlin-Brandenburgische Akademie der Wissenschaften (1853–present).
 René Cagnat et alii, L'Année épigraphique (The Year in Epigraphy, abbreviated AE), Presses Universitaires de France (1888–present).
 George Davis Chase, "The Origin of Roman Praenomina", in Harvard Studies in Classical Philology, vol. VIII, pp. 103–184 (1897).
 John C. Traupman, The New College Latin & English Dictionary, Bantam Books, New York (1995).

Roman gentes